The following is a list of intervals of extended meantone temperament. These intervals constitute the standard vocabulary of intervals for the Western common practice era. Here 12-EDO refers to the size of the interval in 12 equal divisions of the octave temperament, which is the most common meantone temperament of the modern era, 19-EDO to 19 equal temperament, 31-EDO to 31 equal temperament, and 50-EDO to 50 equal temperament. Note that several of the intervals for 31-EDO and 50-EDO are absent from the table.

In How Equal Temperament Ruined Harmony (and Why You Should Care), pp. 91–92, Ross W. Duffin states: "specifying that the major semitone should be 3/2 the minor semitone [a 3:2 ratio] creates a 31-note division of the octave, which, in turn, closely corresponds to extended-quarter-comma meantone... the 5:4 ratio [whose] extended-sixth-comma meantone corresponds to the 55-division... extended-fifth-comma meantone [corresponds to] the 43-division of the octave [in which the] ratio of the major to minor semitone is 4:3." The other meantone correspondencies: a 1:1 ratio producing a 12-division (1/11-comma meantone)... "2:1 [which] results in a 19-division (1/3-comma meantone)... 5:3, which results in a 50-division" (2/7-comma meantone) are derived from these statements. [Brackets added for readability.]

The column of ratios gives a ratio or ratios approximated by the interval in septimal meantone temperament. An augmented interval is increased by a chromatic semitone, and a diminished interval decreased.

See also 

 List of musical intervals
 List of pitch intervals

Linear temperaments
Meantone intervals